WMIA-FM (93.9 MHz) is a hot adult contemporary radio station that is licensed to Miami Beach, Florida. The station is owned and operated by iHeartMedia. Its studios are located in Miramar, and the transmitter site is in Miami Gardens.

History

Early years
93.9 FM signed on the air December 1, 1948, as WLRD, the first standalone FM station in Miami. It was built by Alan Henry, Leo and Yvette Rosenson, doing business as the Mercantile Broadcasting Company; studios were in the Mercantile National Bank building at 420 Lincoln Road. The original  mast at 812 First Street was damaged in Hurricane King in 1950. Early programming was background music.

The station became WAHR-FM in 1956 after the establishment of WAHR (1490 AM) two years prior. From this point, the FM primarily simulcast the AM. Both stations were sold to Community Service Broadcasting of Cincinnati in 1958, with the call letters changed to WMET-AM-FM, Four years later, WMBM-FM struck out on its own with a jazz format and changed its call sign to WMVJ ("Miami's Voice of Jazz"). The change was reverted the next year, but it split off again as WGOS in 1966. Initially airing a gospel format, this changed to country "Wild Goose Country". In 1968, WGOS became WBUS; by 1970, it had turned the letters into business, airing a business news format. Three years later, WBUS flipped to progressive rock as "The Magic Bus". A jazz format returned in 1974, and the station hired Symphony Sid out of retirement for its air staff.

Love 94
On October 29, 1976, after losing money with the jazz format, the station became WWWL "Love 94", changing to a "soft rock" adult contemporary format. DJ Irene Richard (later Irene Richard Brandon) joined the station in 1976, becoming one of South Florida's earliest, pioneer female broadcasters. The WLVE call letters were adopted in 1984 after being surrendered by a station in Madison, Wisconsin. Later, the soft rock transitioned to smooth jazz and was successful for many years. On Sunday mornings, Love 94 had a Sunday Jazz Brunch program hosted by Stu Grant and a Brazilian Jazz program called "Brazilian Love Jazz" hosted by Gina Martell every Sunday evening. It also had a satellite station, WWLV 94.3 in West Palm Beach from 1998 to 2003.  In the later years, however, due to the increasing amount of R&B and Adult Contemporary music being added to the playlist by Broadcast Architecture (which WLVE adopted in 2007), the ratings started to decrease drastically.

After Love: WMIA-FM
On December 25, 2008, WLVE flipped to rhythmic AC as "93.9 MIA." The demise followed the lead of similarly formatted stations in other cities, such as Dallas, Houston, New York City and Washington, D.C. The first song was Will Smith's "Miami", which is a reflection upon where the city it broadcasts from.

In 2010, WMIA-FM began adding more pop titles from artists such as Maroon 5, Michael Bublé, Kelly Clarkson, and Taylor Swift to its playlist, following a pattern used by sister stations such as WWVA-FM and WISX which eventually evolved out of, or switched from rhythmic AC, as the station became more hot adult contemporary.  In November 2010, the station switched to all-Christmas music. While there were rumors that the station would flip to adult top 40 after the holidays, the rhythmic AC format returned on Christmas Day 2010, at 11:58 AM, with "Material Girl" by Madonna being the first song to be played. By that time, although WMIA-FM had continued to be listed on Mediabase's hot AC panel, its playlist had shifted back to a rhythmic direction with less hot AC material. By June 2012, BDS has moved the station to the Top 40 panel due to its increasing amount of rhythmic pop product, although this was done to complement sister station WHYI-FM, who is the market's primary Top 40/CHR outlet, and to a lesser extent, to shift the older 1980s, 1990s and 2000s product to adult hits sister WSHE.

Once again, in December 2012, WMIA-FM revamped their direction to adult top 40 with recurrents from the 1990s and 2000s, billing themselves as "90s and Now". The majority of rhythmic material that had not charted on that format was dropped, only to reinstate it by the spring of 2013, when it dropped most of the 1990s music and changed its slogan to "Today's Hits". It also adopted an adult top 40 presentation, using the same approach as sister station WKTU in the New York City market, and in early 2014, changed slogans to "Miami's Variety from the '90s to Now". In May 2014, WMIA-FM changed their slogan to "93.9 MIA Means Variety" and added 1980s hit songs to their playlist.

On August 8, 2014, WMIA-FM rebranded as "MY 93.9" with their slogan becoming "More Music, Better Variety”. This change came after WMIA-FM was the lowest rated music station in the Nielsen ratings for the Miami market, with a 2.3 share in the July 2014 ratings. "MY 93.9" dropped most of the 1980s material from their playlist and focused on hits from the 1990s and 2000s.

On March 18, 2016, WMIA-FM rebranded once again as "93.9 MIA", shifting back to rhythmic AC with the new slogan "Rhythm from the 80s to Now." In March 2018, the station shifted to hot adult contemporary.  This put WMIA-FM in a crowded field for adult music competing between WFEZ, WLYF, WFLC and WRMF.

On July 9, 2020, at Noon, after playing "End of the Road" by Boyz II Men, WMIA-FM flipped to 1990s hits, branded as "Totally 93.9". The first song was "Miami" by Will Smith (which was also the first song on "93.9 MIA" in December 2008).

On February 9, 2022, at 6 a.m., after playing "End of the Road" by Boyz II Men, WMIA-FM flipped back to hot adult contemporary and the "93.9 MIA". The first song after the relaunch was "Locked Out of Heaven" by Bruno Mars.

WMIA-FM HD2
WMIA-FM signed on HD Radio operations in 2006. The HD1 sub-channel airs the same format as the analog, while the HD2 sub-channel initially aired a traditional jazz format. When the analog/HD1 format flipped to Rhythmic AC in 2008, the smooth jazz format moved to the HD2 channel. On July 11, 2014, WMIA-FMHD2 flipped to Country, branded as "93.5 The Bull", which was relayed on FM translator W228BV 93.5 in Fort Lauderdale. On July 1, 2016, Zoo Communications acquired W228BV, and on November 17 of that year, W228BV and Zoo's W284CS (104.7 FM) swapped formats and ownership, with the Country format moving to 104.7 (with iHeart now owning that translator), while the Dance/EDM format of W228BY began simulcasting on W228BV. In addition, "104.7 the Bull" airs several NASCAR events from the Motor Racing Network.

References

External links
93.9 MIA website

MIA-FM
IHeartMedia radio stations
1948 establishments in Florida
Radio stations established in 1948
Hot adult contemporary radio stations in the United States